Christina Næss is a Faroese swimmer. She is the only person ever to have won a gold medal for the Faroe Islands at the Paralympic Games.

Næss represented the Faroe Islands at the 1988 Summer Paralympics in Seoul, competing in two swimming events. She medalled in both, taking gold in the 100 metre backstroke (C3 disability category), and silver in the 400 metre freestyle (C3-4).

She did not compete again at the Paralympic Games.

References

External links
 

Paralympic swimmers of the Faroe Islands
Swimmers at the 1988 Summer Paralympics
Paralympic gold medalists for the Faroe Islands
Paralympic silver medalists for the Faroe Islands
Faroese female swimmers
Living people
Female backstroke swimmers
Faroese female freestyle swimmers
Medalists at the 1988 Summer Paralympics
Year of birth missing (living people)
Paralympic medalists in swimming